Phacellus boryi is a species of beetle in the family Cerambycidae. It was described by Gory in 1832. It is known from Brazil, French Guiana and Suriname.

References

Phacellini
Beetles described in 1832